Dąbrowa  is a village in Mogilno County, Kuyavian-Pomeranian Voivodeship, in north-central Poland. It is the seat of the gmina (administrative district) called Gmina Dąbrowa.

The village has a population of 1,450.

References

Villages in Mogilno County